Highly Dangerous is a 1950 British spy film starring Margaret Lockwood. The screenplay was written by Eric Ambler.

It was released in the US by Lippert Pictures as Time Running Out.

Plot
Frances Gray is as a British entomologist trying to stop a biological attack with the help of an American journalist.

Cast

Production
Margaret Lockwood had not made a film in 18 months following Madness of the Heart, and had been focusing on stage work.
Earl St John wanted a comeback vehicle and commissioned Eric Ambler to write a film specifically as a vehicle for Lockwood. Ambler had recently specialised in melodramas, but Highly Dangerous was a comedy thriller in the vein of Lockwood's earlier hits, The Lady Vanishes and Night Train to Munich. It was directed by Roy Ward Baker, who had served with Ambler during the war.

"One thing about Eric is that he presents you with a script that is beautifully finished in every detail", said Baker. He added " Eric had invented a language for the people the other side of the curtain which wasn’t Russian or anything else and the poor actors had to learn this stuff. He was playing a game with that." 

"I think Margaret Lockwood wanted to play a modern woman", recalled Baker. "It was actually Eric Ambler's first or second book, although the book had a different title and its main character was a man; Eric changed it to a woman to make it more interesting."

The studio wanted a Hollywood leading man to play opposite Lockwood. Wendell Corey was originally sought before the role was given to Dane Clark, who had recently left Warner Bros. "He was just delivering a stock leading man movie performance which was virtually nothing," said Baker. "He wasn’t very efficient. I think he fell in love with London. He also fell deeply in love with Jean Simmonds which was unrequited. He was a pillock I’m afraid. Marius Goring played the Belgravian heavy he was very heavy I'm afraid. I couldn't control him at all. It was a satisfactory run of the mill picture."

There was location work done in Trieste. "I found it very difficult to make anything of that location," said Baker. "I was a bit disappointed and to tell the truth I didn't do it very
well. The reason I say that is that many years later... I realised I’d been trying to piece it together in a logical way, sticking to the topography of Trieste I’d done myself an injury because the audience doesn't give a damn." 

Filming started at Pinewood Studios in June 1950.

Reception
Baker later said that "Highly Dangerous wasn't a very successful picture.... It was a good idea although I don't think I did it very well."

Filmink said "it should have been Lady Vanishes-like but the film never gets its tone right. It starts off straight then goes a bit wacky and is just not fun – it lacks comic relief, and Lockwood seems old and tired."

References

McFarlane, Brian, An Autobiography of British Cinema,  1997

External links

Highly Dangerous at TCMDB
Highly Dangerous at Britmovie

Film4 review
Review of film at Variety

1950 films
British spy films
Cold War spy films
British black-and-white films
Films shot at Pinewood Studios
Films directed by Roy Ward Baker
1950s action films
Films scored by Richard Addinsell
Lippert Pictures films
1950s spy films
1950s English-language films
1950s British films